Maleev a Slavic surname and it may refer to:

Maleev
Alex Maleev, Bulgarian comic book artist
Evgeny Maleev, Russian paleontologist

Maleeva
 The Maleeva sisters:
Katerina Maleeva, Bulgarian tennis player
Magdalena Maleeva, Bulgarian tennis player
Manuela Maleeva, Bulgarian tennis player

See also
Maleevus, dinosaur

Bulgarian-language surnames
Russian-language surnames